MIX, the Milan Internet eXchange, is a not-for-profit Milan-based Internet exchange point (IXP) founded in 2000 and currently has 357 members, making it the largest IXP in Italy.

References 

Internet exchange points in Italy